This is a list of flags used in or otherwise associated with Peru.  For further information, see Flag of Peru.

National flags

Current

Historical

Government

Military

Political flags

Proposed flags

Subnational flags

Departments

Provinces

Districts

Cities

See also
 Coat of arms of Peru
 National Anthem of Peru
 Vexillology

References

External links

 
 Peruvian flag history
 Peru Flag at Flagscorner.com

 
Peru
Flags